Ewa Białołęcka (born 14 December 1967 in Elbląg) is a Polish fantasy writer. She currently lives in Gdańsk. Her literary debut was her short story Wariatka (Madwoman), published in 1993. Since then she has written more than a dozen short stories, two of which, Tkacz Iluzji (Weaver of Illusions) (1994) and Błękit Maga (Magician's Blue) (1997) were awarded with the Janusz A. Zajdel Award, and another, Nocny śpiewak (The Night Singer), nominated to this award. She also published Piołun i miód (Wormwood and Honey), all of which are part of the Kroniki Drugiego Kręgu (The Chronicles of the Second Circle) series. In 2005, she published Naznaczeni błękitem (Marked with Blue), which is a new version of the Tkacz Iluzji short story collection, made more consistent with the other two novels. Białołęcka also creates stained glass works.

Works

Kroniki Drugiego Kręgu series 
 Kamień na szczycie, 2002
 Piołun i miód, 2003

Other novels 
 Wiedźma.com.pl, 2008

Collections 
 Naznaczeni błękitem, 2005-2011
 Tkacz Iluzji, 1997
 Róża Selerbergu, 2006

References

External links 
 Website presenting some of her stained glass works

1967 births
Living people
People from Elbląg
Polish fantasy writers
Polish women writers
Women science fiction and fantasy writers